Pleurothyrium hexaglandulosum is a species of plant in the family Lauraceae. It is found in Costa Rica and Panama.

References

Lauraceae
Vulnerable plants
Flora of Costa Rica
Flora of Panama
Taxonomy articles created by Polbot